This is a list of mayors of Lincoln, Nebraska, United States.

{| class="wikitable"
!#
!Name
!Term began
!Term ended
|-
|1
|William F. Chapin
|1871
|1872
|-
|2
|Erastus E. Brown
|1872
|1873
|-
|3
|Robert D. Silver, Jr.
|1873
|1874
|-
|4
|Samuel W. Little
|1874
|1875
|-
|5
|Amasa Cobb
|1875
|1876
|-
|6
|Robert D. Silver, Jr.
|1876
|1877
|-
|7
|Harvey W. Hardy
|1877
|1879
|-
|8
|Seth P. Galey
|1879
|1880
|-
|9
|John B. Wright
|1880
|1881
|-
|10
|John Doolittle
|1882
|1883
|-
|11
|Robert Emmett Moore
|1883
|1885
|-
|12
|Carlos C. Burr
|1885
|1887
|-
|13
|Andrew J. Sawyer
|1887
|1889
|-
|14
|Robert B. Graham
|1889
|1891
|-
|15
|Austin H. Weir
|1891
|1895
|-
|16
|Frank A. Graham
|1895
|1899
|-
|17
|Hudson J. Winnett
|1899
|1903
|-
|18
|George A. Adams
|1903
|1905
|-
|19
|Francis W. Brown
|1905
|1909
|-
|20
|Don Lathrop Love
|1909
|1911
|-
|21
|Alvin H. Armstrong
|1911
|1913
|-
|22
|Frank Connell Zehrung
|1913
|1915
|-
|23
|Charles W. Bryan
|1915
|1917
|-
|24
|John Eschelman Miller
|1917
|1920
|-
|25
|Frank Connell Zehrung
|1921
|1927
|-
|26
|Verne Hedge
|1927
|1929
|-
|27
|Don Lathrop Love
|1929
|1931
|-
|28
|Frank Connell Zehrung
|1931
|1933
|-
|29
|Fenton B. Fleming
|1933
|1935
|-
|30
|Charles W. Bryan
|1935
|1937
|-
|31
|Oren Sturmon Copeland
|1937
|1939
|-
|32
|Robert Erle Campbell
|1939
|1941
|-
|33
|Richard O. Johnson
|1941
|1943
|-
|34
|Lloyd J. Marti
|1943
|1947
|-
|35
|Clarence Gillespie Miles
|1947
|1950
|-
|36
|Thomas R. Pansing
|July 31, 1950
|September 11, 1950
|-
|37
|Victor Emanuel Anderson
|1950
|1953
|-
|38
|Clark Jeary
|1953
|1956
|-
|39
|Bennett S. Martin
|1956
|1959
|-
|40
|Bartlett E. (Pat) Boyles
|1959
|1962
|-
|41
|Dell L. Tyrrell
|January 1963
|May 1963
|-
|42
|Dean H. Peterson
|1963
|1967
|-
|43
|Sam Schwartzkopf
|1967
|1975
|-
|44
|Helen Boosalis
|1975
|1983
|-
|45
|Roland A. Luedtke
|1983
|1987
|-
|46
|Bill Harris
|1987
|1991
|-
|47
|Mike Johanns
|1991
|1998
|-
|48
|Dale Young
|1998
|1999
|-
|49
|Don Wesely
|1999
|2003
|-
|50
|Coleen Seng
|2003
|May 14, 2007
|-
|51
|Chris Beutler
|May 14, 2007
|May 20, 2019
|-
|52
|Leirion Gaylor Baird
|May 20, 2019
|Present

Lincoln
 
History of Lincoln, Nebraska
Lincoln, Nebraska